Julian Miles Trevelyan (born 29 October 1998) is a British concert pianist.  He is the son of Sir Peter John Trevelyan, 6th Baronet, and Diane Terry and is heir apparent to the Trevelyan Baronetcy of Wallington. He is related to Julian Trevelyan the artist.

Trevelyan has been home-schooled. His music teachers included Elizabeth Altman, Christopher Elton, Patrick Hemmerlé for piano and Catherine Manson for violin.

He studied at the École Normale de Musique de Paris with  supported by a scholarship from the Or du Rhin Foundation and Patrick Masure, where he was awarded the Diplôme Supérieure de Composition in 2018 and the Diplôme Supérieure de Concertiste (Piano) in 2019. He also studies for a musicology degree at the University of Oxford.

Career 
Julian has travelled widely to give solo and orchestral concerts.  These include piano sonatas by Beethoven and Shostakovich, and the Beethoven Diabelli Variations.  Piano concertos include Brahms, Howard Blake, Bartók, Prokofiev, Shostakovich, Tchaikovsky and Mozart.

As well as competitions, Julian Trevelyan has studied in masterclasses led by Stephen Kovacevich and Menahem Pressler, Paul Badura-Skoda and Jean-Marc Luisada at the Musikverein, Vienna in 2019, Maria João Pires, in 2017, Peter Feuchtwanger, 2015 and Margaret Fingerhut, 2014.

Trevelyan was a finalist in the keyboard section of the BBC Young Musician of the Year competition.

In April 2015, Trevelyan took the Grand Prize in the "Concours Festival pour le Répertoire Pianistique Moderne" (Competitive Festival for the Contemporary Piano Repertoire, or C.F.R.P.M.) in Paris,  including the prize for the best interpretation of a work by Maurice Ravel.

In May 2016, he took second place and the Mocsari Prize (given by Károly Mocsári) in the Ile-de-France International Piano Competition in Maisons-Laffitte.

On the 27 October 2016, at the age of 16, Julian Trevelyan became the youngest prize-winner ever in the piano section of the Concours International Long-Thibaud-Crespin in Paris.  He won the second Grand Prize, the first prize not being awarded that year, as well as the Prize awarded by Prince Albert II of Monaco for the best interpretation of the concerto.  The Long Piano prize is one of the four major international piano competitions.

In November 2016, he was the winner of the Young Pianist of the North, competition, held in Newcastle upon Tyne, England.

In 2016, Trevelyan continued his modest international competition record for a British pianist, by coming second in the "Kissinger Klavierolymp" (Bad Kissingen Piano Olympics) for young pianists, as part of the Kissinger Sommer.

In 2017, Trevelyan participated in the Arthur Rubinstein International Piano Master Competition, in which he reached Stage II, the highest placing for British pianist.  Later in the year, he won the "Luitpold Prize" of the Kissinger Sommer festival. In October, he won second prize and the audience vote in the Dudley International Piano Competition.

Trevelyan continued to compete internationally in 2018, participating in the André Dumortier International Competition, where he was again the only British contestant.  He won second prize.

In 2021, he returned to major competition at the Concours Géza Anda, where he was the youngest competitor. Over three rounds and the final, he played Debussy, a Chopin study and sonata, a Bach partita, Brahms and Frank Martin, and piano concertos by Mozart and Bartók. He won the 2nd Grand Prize for his performance overall in the competition, as well as the Mozart Prize awarded by the Musikkollegium Winterthur for the semi-final Mozart concerto (N° 9), and the Géza Anda Audience Prize voted by the public for his interpretation of Bela Bartók's 3rd Piano Concerto.

In 2022, he participated in the audition phase of the Sixteenth Van Cliburn International Piano Competition.

References

External links 
 
 Site du concours
 Julian Trevelyan on the BBC
 Concours 2020

1998 births
Long-Thibaud-Crespin Competition prize-winners
British classical pianists
Male classical pianists
Living people
Macaulay family of Lewis
21st-century classical pianists
Alumni of the University of Oxford
21st-century British male musicians